Novouvarovka is a rural locality (a village) in Ulyakhinskoye Rural Settlement, Gus-Khrustalny District, Vladimir Oblast, Russia. The population was 7 as of 2010.

Geography 
Novouvarovka is located 54 km south of Gus-Khrustalny (the district's administrative centre) by road. Novo-Maltsevo is the nearest rural locality.

References 

Rural localities in Gus-Khrustalny District